Home Sweet Home is a 2010 South Korean television series. The mystery melodrama starring Kim Hye-soo and Hwang Shin-hye aired on Wednesday and Thursday nights on MBC from October 27 to December 23, 2010 at 9:55 p.m.

Plot
Kim Jin-seo (Kim Hye-soo) is a psychiatrist out to uncover the truth behind the death of Sung Eun-pil (Kim Kap-soo). In doing so, Kim realizes that the deceased Sung's wife, Mo Yoon-hee (Hwang Shin-hye), may not only have been involved in Sung's death but that she has also been having an affair with Kim's husband, Lee Sang-hyun (Shin Sung-woo).

Cast
 Kim Hye-soo as Kim Jin-seo
 Hwang Shin-hye as Mo Yoon-hee
 Shin Sung-woo as Lee Sang-hyun
 Lee Sang-yoon as Kang Shin-woo
 Youn Yuh-jung as Sung Eun-sook (Eun-pil's sister)
 Kim Kap-soo as Sung Eun-pil (Yoon-hee's husband)
 Lee Eui-jung as Kim Jin-hye (Jin-seo's sister)
 Song Young-kyu as Heo Young-min (Jin-hye's husband)
 Jung Hye-sun as Park Dool-nam (Jin-seo's mother-in-law)
 Nam Da-reum as Lee Min-jo (Jin-seo's son)
 Jung Joo-eun as Han Hee-soo
 Lee Seol-ah as Sung Eun-jae
 Choi Su-rin as Jo Soo-min
 Lee Jung-sung as Lawyer Go
 Jung Won-joong as Tak Kyung-hwan
 Jung Jin-gak as Woo Jang-soon
 Song Min-hyung as Choi Byung-dal
 Han Min-chae as Curator Choi
 Kim Young-hoon as Assistant Kim

Awards
2010 MBC Drama Awards
 Best New Actor - Lee Sang-yoon
 PD Award - Oh Kyung-hoon
 Achievement Award - Jung Hye-sun

References

External links
 Home Sweet Home official MBC website 
 Home Sweet Home at MBC Global Media
 
 

MBC TV television dramas
2010 South Korean television series debuts
2010 South Korean television series endings
Korean-language television shows
South Korean mystery television series
South Korean melodrama television series
Television series by Pan Entertainment